Diane Mary Fahey (born 2 January 1945) is an Australian poet. She was born Diane Mary Brotheridge in Melbourne, Australia and lives in the Barwon Heads area, near Geelong.

A winner of the 1985 Mattara Poetry Prize and many other awards, Fahey has been widely published in Australian and internationally and received writing grants from the Australia Council, Arts Victoria and Arts South Australia. She has been writer in residence at Ormond College, University of Melbourne and the University of Adelaide.

Her main creative concerns are nature writing, Greek myths, visual art, fairy tales and literary mystery novels.  Her most recent collection Sea Wall and River Light (Five Islands Press) is a series of sonnets about Barwon Heads, tracing the year at that place.

Fahey holds a B.A. and an M.A. in Literature and a PhD in Creative Writing for her study, 'Places and Spaces of the Writing Life'.

Publications
Voices from the Honeycomb (1986)
Metamorphoses (1988)
Turning the Hourglass (1990)
Mayflies in Amber (1994)
The Body in Time (1995)
Listening to a Far Sea (1998)
The Sixth Swan (2001)
Sea Wall and River Light (2006)
The Mystery of Rosa Morland (2008)

External links
Diane Fahey at friendlystreetpoets.org.au

1945 births
Australian women poets
Living people
Poets from Melbourne